H101 may refer to:
 H101 virus, the first oncolytic virus to be approved by a regulatory agency
 Glasflügel H-101
 BAE Orion (H-101), a ship of the Ecuadorian Navy